José Joaquim de Campos da Costa de Medeiros e Albuquerque (4 September 1867 – 9 June 1934) was a Brazilian poet, politician, teacher, journalist, short story writer, civil servant, essayist, orator, novelist and dramatist. He is famous for writing the lyrics of the Brazilian Republic Anthem in 1890.

He founded and occupied the 22nd chair of the Brazilian Academy of Letters from 1897 until his death in 1934.

He was also the President of the Academy in 1923.

Life
Albuquerque was born in 1867 in Recife, Pernambuco, the son of Dr. José Joaquim de Campos de Medeiros e Albuquerque. Initially homeschooled by his mother, he studied at the Colégio Pedro II and later in Lisbon. Returning to Brazil, he studied natural history with Émil Goeldi and was tutored by Sílvio Romero. He initially worked as a primary teacher, getting in contact with famous writers such as Francisco de Paula Ney and Pardal Mallet. In 1889 he published his first poetry books: Pecados and Canções da Decadência, of strong Symbolist influence.

In 1888 he worked for the newspaper Novidades alongside Alcindo Guanabara, defending Abolitionist ideals. With the proclamation of the Republic in Brazil, he was nominated a secretary by Aristides Lobo and a minister by Benjamin Constant Botelho de Magalhães. From 1890 onwards he became a teacher for the Escola Nacional de Belas Artes and wrote the lyrics of the Brazilian Republic Anthem.

He was a convicted atheist for most of his life, but he converted to catholicism later in life.

During his last years of life, he would write for many newspapers, using pen names such as Armando Quevedo, Atasius Noll, J. dos Santos, Max and Rifiúfio Singapura.

He died in 1934.

Works

Poetry
 Pecados (1889)
 Canções da Decadência (1889)
 Poesias 1893—1901 (1904)
 Fim (1922)
 Poemas Sem Versos (1924)
 Quando Eu Falava de Amor (1933)

Short stories
 Um Homem Prático (1898)
 Mãe Tapuia (1900)
 Contos Escolhidos (1907)
 O Assassinato do General (1926)
 O Umbigo de Adão (1932)
 Se Eu Fosse Sherlock Holmes (1932)
 Segredo Conjugal (co-authorship – 1934)
 Surpresas (1934)

Novels
 Marta (1920)
 Mistério (co-authorship – 1921)
 Laura (1933)

Theatre plays
 O Escândalo (1910)
 Teatro Meu... E dos Outros (1923)

Essays and conferences
 Em Voz Alta (1909)
 O Silêncio É de Ouro (1912)
 Pontos de Vista (1913)
 Literatura Alheia (1914)
 Páginas de Crítica (1920)
 O Hipnotismo (1921)
 Graves e Fúteis (1922)
 Homens e Coisas da Academia (1934)
 A Obra de Júlio Dantas (n.d.)

Memoirs and travel accounts
 Por Alheias Terras... (1931)
 Minha Vida: Da Infância à Mocidade (1867—1893) (1933)
 Minha Vida: Da Mocidade à Velhice (1893—1934) (1934)

References

External links
 
 
 
 Excerpts of works by Albuquerque at the official site of the Brazilian Academy of Letters 
 Albuquerque's biography at the official site of the Brazilian Academy of Letters 

1867 births
1934 deaths
Brazilian male poets
Brazilian male novelists
Brazilian journalists
20th-century Brazilian dramatists and playwrights
Brazilian male dramatists and playwrights
Brazilian male short story writers
Brazilian politicians
Brazilian abolitionists
Brazilian memoirists
People from Recife
Politicians from Recife
Members of the Brazilian Academy of Letters
Converts to Roman Catholicism from atheism or agnosticism
Portuguese-language writers
19th-century Brazilian poets
20th-century Brazilian poets
19th-century Brazilian short story writers
19th-century Brazilian male writers
20th-century Brazilian short story writers
20th-century Brazilian male writers
20th-century Brazilian novelists